Wesley Saunders (born June 16, 1993) is an American professional basketball player who last played for the Ontario Clippers of the NBA G League. He played college basketball for the Harvard Crimson.

High school career
Saunders lettered in basketball and volleyball at Windward High serving as basketball captain during his senior year. On that season he averaged 20.2 points and 10 rebounds per game and helped his team to win Division IV's state basketball, after winning the State Championship for Division V as a sophomore.

College career
In his four-year career at Harvard, Saunders averaged 12.6 points, 4.1 rebounds, 3.2 assists and 1.5 steals over 29.8 minutes in 120 games, and averaged career-highs of 16.6 points, 6.1 rebounds and 4.3 assists as a senior, earning the Ivy League Player of the Year in 2014 alongside his third All-Ivy League first-team selection.

Professional career

Westchester Knicks (2015–2016)
After going undrafted in the 2015 NBA draft, Saunders joined the Utah Jazz for the 2015 NBA Summer League. On September 10, 2015, he signed with the New York Knicks. However, he was later waived by the Knicks on October 23 after appearing in two preseason games. On November 2, he was acquired by the Westchester Knicks of the NBA Development League as an affiliate player of New York. On November 12, he made his professional debut in a 105–103 win over the Maine Red Claws, recording two points, three rebounds, one assist and one steal in 13 minutes off the bench.

Austin Spurs (2016)
On February 23, 2016, he was traded to the Austin Spurs in exchange for Keith Wright. On March 24, he made his debut for Austin in a 106–93 win over the Texas Legends, recording one rebound in two minutes off the bench.

Windy City Bulls (2016–2017)
On August 24, 2016, Saunders' D-League rights were acquired by the Windy City Bulls in the expansion draft and on October 30, he was officially signed by Windy City.

On July 26, 2018, Saunders signed a deal with the Italian club Vanoli Cremona.

On July 30, 2020, he has signed with As Monaco of the LNB Pro A but resigned shortly after the beginning of the season.

Coach Sacchetti, who coached him the two years in Vanoli Cremona before he moved to coach Fortitudo Bologna, inked Saunders in Bologna on November 4, 2020. He parted ways with the team on June 30, 2021.

On August 13, 2021, he has signed with Dolomiti Energia Trento of the Italian Lega Basket Serie A (LBA).

Santa Cruz Warriors (2022–2023)
On December 20, 2022, Saunders was acquired by the Santa Cruz Warriors. On January 18, 2023, Saunders was waived.

Ontario Clippers (2023)
On January 20, 2023, Saunders was acquired by the Ontario Clippers. On March 1, 2023, Saunders was waived.

Personal life
Saunders' father, Ed, played defensive back at Iowa and graduated in 1977, while his uncle, John, played professional football with the Los Angeles Rams and was drafted in the fourth round of the 1972 NFL draft.

References

External links
Wesley Saunders at nbadleague.com
Wesley Saunders at gocrimson.com

1993 births
Living people
Agua Caliente Clippers players
American expatriate basketball people in Finland
American expatriate basketball people in Italy
American men's basketball players
Aquila Basket Trento players
Austin Spurs players
Basketball players from Los Angeles
Fortitudo Pallacanestro Bologna players
Harvard Crimson men's basketball players
Kataja BC players
Lega Basket Serie A players
Parade High School All-Americans (boys' basketball) 
Santa Cruz Warriors players
Small forwards
Vanoli Cremona players
Westchester Knicks players
Windy City Bulls players